Sushil Chhetri is a Nepalese actor who has worked in the Nepalese film industry for more than a decade. He debuted in Kollywood with the film Aago which received much hype and sensation. Because the story was based on the Maoist crisis it was banned before release. He is best known for his movies Aago (2000) and Gaajal (2001). Chhetri acted in dozens of Nepali movies and 11 Bhojpuri movies. After a sort of disappearance from the Nepali film industry, he came back with his movie Bich Bato (2015). Before entering Kollywood as an actor he started his career as background dancer. After success in his debut movie he rose to super-stardom with string of box office hits and critically acclaimed movies including Bhai (1999), Gaajal (2001), Khandan (2002), Muskaan (2002), Uphar (2003), Ke bho lau na ni (2003), Khayal khaylaiye ma (2004), Muglaan (2004), and Tribeni (2004).

Education
Chhetri completed his primary education from Tika High School, Kathmandu. He further completed I Com from Tahachal Campus and studied B Com till second year from Patan Campus.

Filmography and awards

Chhetri has been honoured with many prestigious awards from national and international organizations. He was one of the nominees for the categories of leading Actor in Dabur Anmol Motion Picture Award (2004) for the Nepali movie Triveni. He was also honoured with the title "Best Actor" in Kolkata for his first movie Aago in Kalakar Awards. He received the award from Bollywood actress Rani Mukherjee.

Filmography

Awards and nominations

See also
 List of Nepalese actors

References

External links
 Sushil Chhetri Official Website
 

Nepalese male film actors
Living people
21st-century Nepalese male actors
Actors from Kathmandu
1974 births